Lofty Drews (born 16 July 1940) is a former rally co-driver from Kenya.

Biography
Born in Tanga, Tanzania, Drews scored his first World Rally Championship win at the 1973 Safari Rally with Shekhar Mehta. Afterwards, he achieved further success with both Sandro Munari and Rauno Aaltonen, and finished on the podium at the event seven more times.

He continued to appear regularly at the Safari Rally until 1990.

References

1940 births
Kenyan rally co-drivers
Living people
World Rally Championship co-drivers
Tanzanian emigrants to Kenya